Seticosta mirana is a species of moth of the family Tortricidae. It was described from Venezuela, but the current status of the species is unclear.

Taxonomy
The holotype was reported to be a male from Venezuela, but is in fact a female. The genitalic preparation of this holotype suggests that the species belongs to the Olethreutinae. However, later dissection of an identical female suggested the species belongs to the genus Seticosta.

References

Moths described in 1875
Seticosta